Lost is the debut solo studio album by American rapper Eightball. It is a double album. The album was released on May 19, 1998, by Draper Inc. Records. 8Ball had already released three albums as a part of the group 8Ball & MJG, but after 1995's On Top of the World the group decided to make solo albums before reuniting as a group.  This was the second of the group's solo albums, being released after MJG's No More Glory. This album has been certified Platinum by the RIAA for selling 1.8 million copies in the U.S. The song "Drama in My Life" was first heard on the soundtrack album to the 1998 film Woo.

Track listing

Charts

Weekly charts

Year-end charts

References

1998 albums
8Ball & MJG albums
Albums produced by Ant Banks
Albums produced by N.O. Joe